Robert or Bob Barry may refer to:

Robert Barry (artist) (born 1936), American artist
Robert Barry (musician) (1938–2018), American jazz musician
Robert L. Barry (born 1934), U.S. diplomat
Robert R. Barry (1915–1988), U.S. Representative from New York
Robert A. Barry (1860–1934), American politician, Missouri state representative
Robert Barry (merchant) (1759–1843), Scottish Canadian merchant
Robert Barry (politician) (1731–1793), Irish MP for Charleville
Monster Bobby (born 1981), real name Robert Barry, English singer-songwriter 
Robert de Barry (fl. 1175), Norman warrior
Bob Barry Jr. (1956–2015), American sportscaster
Bob Barry (photographer) (born 1943), American actor and photographer
Bob Barry Sr. (1931–2011), American sportscaster
Bob Barry (cricketer, born 1868) (1868–1938)
Bob Barry (cricketer, born 1878) (1878–1915)

See also
Robert Barrie (1774–1841), British naval officer
Robert Barrie (pentathlete) (born 1951), Australian modern pentathlete
Robert Berry (disambiguation)